David Výborný (born January 22, 1975) is a Czech former professional ice hockey player who last played for BK Mladá Boleslav of the Czech Extraliga. He played for the Columbus Blue Jackets of the National Hockey League (NHL).

Playing career

Early career
Výborný first rose to prominence playing with Sparta Prague of the Czech Extraliga in 1992. He scored 20 goals and 44 points in 52 games, all as a teenager. The Edmonton Oilers picked Výborný up in the second round of the 1993 NHL Entry Draft, and he proved that he was not a fluke by scoring 46 points for Sparta in the next season.

Výborný came over to North America for the 1994–95 season and played for the Cape Breton Oilers of the American Hockey League (AHL). He again performed quite well, scoring 61 points in 76 games, third most on his team and fifth most among AHL rookies. However, he headed back to Europe after only one season in the AHL. Upon his return to Sparta, he scored at a rigorous pace. He scored 42 points in 40 games and helped Sparta into the playoffs, where he again scored more than a point per game. Výborný spent one more season in Prague and continued to improve with 49 points in 47 games; he added 14 more in the playoffs.

Výborný was a star in the Czech Republic, but he went to Sweden for the 1997–98 season. He played for Modo and led the team in scoring. Again, after just one season abroad, Výborný went back to Sparta Prague. In the 1998–99 season, Výborný cemented his place as one of the stars of the Czech hockey scene. He scored 70 points in 52 games and won the Extraliga's scoring title by 18 points. In the next season, he continued to rack up points and finished second in the league's scoring race. He also won a championship with Sparta.  Finally, it seemed as if Výborný had nothing left to prove in the Czech Republic.

NHL career
On June 8, 2000, Výborný was signed by the Columbus Blue Jackets to add some scoring punch in their first season.  He debuted in the NHL on October 7, and scored a goal on in his very first NHL game. His production for Columbus was much less than it had been in Prague. In the end, he scored 13 goals and 19 assists, for a total of 32 points in 79 games. He was also ranked 10th among rookies for goals and points and was the first rookie ever to score on multiple penalty shots in one season.

Výborný's performance (31 points) was very similar in his second season.  As the Blue Jackets improved, though, so did Výborný. In the 2002–03 NHL season, he scored 46 points and led his team with a +12 plus/minus, which set a record for the Blue Jackets. Výborný improved still more for the 2003–04 NHL season, and he scored 22 goals and 31 assists, for a total of 53 points. He led Columbus in assists and came in second to Rick Nash in goals and points. In addition to his offensive talent, Výborný has proved to be quite durable, as he currently holds the Blue Jackets record for the most consecutive games, with 161. He tied for fourth in the NHL in shorthanded goals with four, another record for the Blue Jackets.

Výborný played for Sparta Prague during the 2004–05 NHL lockout.

Back to Europe
On April 25, 2008, it was announced that Výborný was returning to Sparta Prague for the 2008–09 season. With his departure, Rostislav Klesla became the only remaining player from the Blue Jackets' inaugural season. In 2011, Výborný signed with BK Mlada Boleslav. He helped the club win back-to-back championships in the Czech second-division in 2013 and 2014 and earn promotion to the top Czech division in 2014. After suffering a torn ACL, he announced his retirement on March 15, 2016.

Awards and achievements
 Played in the Czech Ice Hockey Extraliga All-Star game in 1999 and 2000
 Appeared on the cover of the Czech edition of the NHL 2K7 video game.

Records
NHL record for most penalty shot goals in a season by a rookie

International play
Výborný won five World Championships with the Czech national team and a bronze medal at the 2006 Olympic Games. At the 2006 World Championships, when capturing silver, he was named to the All-Tournament Allstar-Team. At the 1997 and 1998 World Championships, he won bronze.

Career statistics

Regular season and playoffs

International

References

External links
 

1975 births
Living people
Cape Breton Oilers players
Columbus Blue Jackets players
Czech ice hockey right wingers
Czechoslovak ice hockey right wingers
HC Sparta Praha players
BK Mladá Boleslav players
Edmonton Oilers draft picks
Ice hockey players at the 2006 Winter Olympics
Medalists at the 2006 Winter Olympics
Modo Hockey players
Olympic bronze medalists for the Czech Republic
Olympic ice hockey players of the Czech Republic
Olympic medalists in ice hockey
Sportspeople from Jihlava
Czech expatriate ice hockey players in the United States
Czech expatriate ice hockey players in Canada